This is a list of films released in 4DX motion seated format.

Films shown in 4DX

2023

2022

2021

2020

2019
You can help by adding to the list.

2018
The list is incomplete. You can help by adding to the list.

2017

2016

2015
The list is incomplete. You can help by adding to the list.

2014

2013

See also
ScreenX
List of ScreenX formatted films
4D film

References

External links

Lists of films by technology